The Diguillín Province is the biggest of the three provinces of the Ñuble Region.

Communes 
Bulnes
Chillán
Chillán Viejo
San Ignacio
Pinto
El Carmen
Pemuco
Yungay
Quillón

References 

 
Provinces of Chile
Provinces of Ñuble Region
Diguillín
2018 establishments in Chile
2018 in Chilean law